Yoden Village Quarry is a Site of Special Scientific Interest in the Easington district of east County Durham, England. It is a disused quarry in the Horden district of Peterlee, adjacent to the site of the medieval village of Yoden.

The site has been classed as of national importance in the Geological Conservation Review because it is the only locality in North-east England where the reef-complex of the Middle Magnesian Limestone Ford Formation is exposed.

References

Sites of Special Scientific Interest in County Durham
Peterlee
Quarries in County Durham